The 2000–01 NBA season was the Jazz's 27th season in the National Basketball Association, and 22nd season in Salt Lake City, Utah. After the retirement of Jeff Hornacek, the Jazz signed free agents Danny Manning, and John Starks, and acquired Donyell Marshall from the Golden State Warriors in an off-season four-team trade. The team also re-signed former Jazz forward David Benoit, and former Jazz guard John Crotty. The Jazz got off to a fast start winning 16 of their first 20 games, but struggled a bit down the stretch losing 9 of their next 13 games, and held a 32–15 record at the All-Star break. They finished second in the Midwest Division with a 53–29 record, and qualified for the playoffs for the eighteenth straight season. On a more positive note, the Jazz equaled the Los Angeles Lakers' record of sixteen consecutive winning seasons above .500, set between 1976–77 and 1991–92. The Jazz were ultimately to make it nineteen consecutive winning seasons before finishing with only 26 wins in 2004–05.

Karl Malone was named to the All-NBA Third Team, averaging 23.2 points, 8.3 rebounds and 4.5 assists per game. He was also selected for the 2001 NBA All-Star Game, which was his final All-Star appearance, and finished in seventh place in Most Valuable Player voting. In addition, Marshall averaged 13.6 points and 7.0 rebounds per game, while Bryon Russell contributed 12.0 points per game, John Stockton provided the team with 11.5 points, 8.7 assists and 1.6 steals per game, and Starks contributed 9.3 points per game.

In the Western Conference First Round, the Jazz took a 2–0 series lead over the 5th-seeded Dallas Mavericks, but would lose the next three games, thus the series, losing Game 5 by one point, 84–83 at the Delta Center, the Jazz's first round playoff loss since the 1994–95 season. Following the season, Manning signed as a free agent with the Dallas Mavericks, while Jacque Vaughn signed with the Atlanta Hawks, and Benoit and Olden Polynice were both released to free agency.

Draft picks

Roster

Regular season

Season standings

Record vs. opponents

Game log

Playoffs

|- align="center" bgcolor="#ccffcc"
| 1
| April 21
| Dallas
| W 88–86
| Karl Malone (26)
| Bryon Russell (12)
| John Stockton (18)
| Delta Center19,100
| 1–0
|- align="center" bgcolor="#ccffcc"
| 2
| April 24
| Dallas
| W 109–98
| Karl Malone (34)
| Bryon Russell (8)
| John Stockton (9)
| Delta Center19,911
| 2–0
|- align="center" bgcolor="#ffcccc"
| 3
| April 28
| @ Dallas
| L 91–94
| Karl Malone (29)
| Karl Malone (13)
| John Stockton (10)
| Reunion Arena18,187
| 2–1
|- align="center" bgcolor="#ffcccc"
| 4
| May 1
| @ Dallas
| L 77–107
| Karl Malone (25)
| Donyell Marshall (9)
| John Stockton (9)
| Reunion Arena18,300
| 2–2
|- align="center" bgcolor="#ffcccc"
| 5
| May 3
| Dallas
| L 83–84
| Karl Malone (24)
| Karl Malone (10)
| John Stockton (11)
| Delta Center19,911
| 2–3
|-

Player statistics

NOTE: Please write the players statistics in alphabetical order by last name.

Season

Playoffs

Awards and records
 Karl Malone, All-NBA Third Team

Transactions

References

Utah Jazz seasons
Utah
Utah
Utah